Francis Vaiotu (born 8 January 1986) is a New Zealand rugby league footballer for Sydney Roosters in the National Rugby League. His positions of choice is Winger or Centre. He made is NRL Debut in Round 14 2011 against the Melbourne Storm. Francis has a Diploma in Community Welfare from TAFE and a Bachelor of Health Science PDHPE degree from the University of Western Sydney.
Vaiotu is a product of rugby league club Cabramatta Two Blues and school Fairfield Patrician Brothers College. He is married to Erin Vaiotu (m. 2016).

References

1986 births
Sydney Roosters players
Rugby league wingers
Mount Pritchard Mounties players
Rugby league centres
New Zealand rugby league players
Newtown Jets NSW Cup players
Living people
Western Sydney University alumni